Brief (stylized BRIEF or B.R.I.E.F., a backronym for Basic Reconfigurable Interactive Editing Facility), is a once-popular programmer's text editor in the 1980s and early 1990s. It was originally released for MS-DOS, then IBM OS/2 and Microsoft Windows. The Brief interface and functionality live on, including via the SourceForge GRIEF editor.

History
Brief was designed and developed by UnderWare Inc, a company founded in Providence, Rhode Island by David Nanian and Michael Strickman, and was published by Solution Systems. UnderWare moved to Boston, Massachusetts in 1985. Solution Systems released version 2.1 in 1988.

In 1990, UnderWare sold Brief to Solution Systems, which released version 3.1. 
 
Solution Systems advertised the $195 Brief as a "Program Editing Breakthrough! / Get 20% More Done". In 1990 Solutions Systems brought in Eric Perkins as technical architect and team lead to port the OS/2 version of Brief to the Windows platform as quickly as possible. The end result was to sell the Solution System assets to the highest bidder. Within 6 months, the team of Eric Perkins, Blake Nelson and Jeff Simpson worked closely with David Nanian and Mike Strickman and ported Brief OS/2 to Windows using an MVC architecture. It was this version that was demonstrated at Spring Comdex 1991 to Borland and others, with Borland later purchasing Brief and the full suite of software tools from Solutions Systems.

Solution Systems closed permanently after the sale to Borland. Brief is no longer sold by Borland.

Features
The original product features contain:

Brief for Windows features
 All the features of Brief for DOS and OS/2
 The first programmer's editor to make use of the Windows WYSIWYG environment
 Color coding of language constructs
 Multitask within Windows environment
 Full use of Windows memory for caching all files and macros
 Ability to spawn off compiles to a DOS box without leaving the editor

Popularity
Both the Brief interface and its functionality had a following, and they live on via SourceForge's GRIEF.

Clones
Some Vim and Emacs packages provide Brief functionality.  There was more than one program written to provide Brief-like functionality:

Emulators
The Brief keyboard layout became popular and was implemented in or emulated by other editors, such as Lugaru Epsilon, by providing a remapping of the keyboard shortcuts and editor behavior; dBase, an early DOS-day database, also copied this keyboard mapping.

References

External links
 Official website
 TextEditors Wiki: BriefFamily

Windows text editors
Borland software
DOS text editors